The Polish town of Kętrzyn was formerly known as Rastenburg.

Rastenberg is a town in the district of Sömmerda, in Thuringia, Germany. It is situated 22 km east of Sömmerda, and 23 km northeast of Weimar.

History
Within the German Empire (1871-1918), Rastenberg was part of the Grand Duchy of Saxe-Weimar-Eisenach.

References

Sömmerda (district)
Grand Duchy of Saxe-Weimar-Eisenach